This list of castles in Limousin is a list of medieval castles or château forts in the region in southern France.

Links in italics are links to articles in the French Wikipedia.

Corrèze

Creuse

Haute-Vienne

See also
 List of castles in France
 List of châteaux in France

References

 Limousin